The Peterville Diamond is a 1942 British comedy film directed by Walter Forde and starring Anne Crawford, Donald Stewart and Renee Houston. It is also known by the alternative title Jewel Robbery. - from the 1931 play of the same title; previously filmed in Hollywood in 1932.

Plot
In an effort to get her businessman husband to listen to her, a wife feigns interest in the famed Peterville Diamond. After a charming thief steals it from her, shenanigans, double-dealing and finally a chase, ensue.

Cast

Production
Ladislas Fodor's play was adapted for the screen by Gordon Wellesley and Brock Williams. It was made at Teddington Studios by the British subsidiary of Warner Brothers. The film's sets were by the resident art director Norman Arnold.

Critical reception
TV Guide gave the film two out of four stars, calling it "An enjoyable light comedy with some witty repartee." while Allmovie thought it "Not a great film," however "still a much, much better film than one would expect from something which was filmed merely as a 'quota quickie.'"

See also
 Jewel Robbery (1932)

References

Bibliography
 Hutchings, Peter. Terence Fisher. Manchester University Press, 2001.

External links
 
 
 

1942 films
1942 comedy films
British comedy films
Films directed by Walter Forde
Films set in England
Films shot at Teddington Studios
Warner Bros. films
British films based on plays
British remakes of American films
British black-and-white films
Films scored by Jack Beaver
Quota quickies
1943 comedy films
1943 films
1940s English-language films
1940s British films